The Namib is a coastal desert in Southern Africa. The name  is of Khoekhoegowab origin and means "vast place". According to the broadest definition, the Namib stretches for more than  along the Atlantic coasts of Angola, Namibia, and South Africa, extending southward from the Carunjamba River in Angola, through Namibia and to the Olifants River in Western Cape, South Africa. The Namib's northernmost portion, which extends  from the Angola-Namibia border, is known as Moçâmedes Desert, while its southern portion approaches the neighboring Kalahari Desert. Having endured arid or semi-arid conditions for roughly 55–80 million years, the Namib may be the oldest desert in the world and contains some of the world's driest regions, with only western South America's Atacama Desert to challenge it for age and aridity benchmarks.

The desert geology consists of sand seas near the coast, while gravel plains and scattered mountain outcrops occur further inland. Temperatures along the coast are stable and generally range between  annually, while temperatures further inland are variable—summer daytime temperatures can exceed  while nights can be freezing. Fogs that originate offshore from the collision of the cold Benguela Current and warm air from the Hadley Cell create a fog belt that frequently envelops parts of the desert. Coastal regions can experience more than 180 days of thick fog a year. While this has proved a major hazard to ships—more than a thousand wrecks litter the Skeleton Coast—it is a vital source of moisture for desert life.

The Namib is almost completely uninhabited by humans except for several small settlements and indigenous pastoral groups, including the Ovahimba and Obatjimba Herero in the north, and the Topnaar Nama in the central region. Owing to its antiquity, the Namib may be home to more endemic species than any other desert in the world. Most of the desert wildlife is arthropods and other small animals that live on little water, although larger animals inhabit the northern regions. Near the coast, the cold ocean water is rich in fishery resources and supports populations of brown fur seals and shorebirds, which serve as prey for the Skeleton Coast's lions. Further inland, the Namib-Naukluft National Park, the largest game park in Africa, supports populations of African bush elephants, mountain zebras, and other large mammals. Although the outer Namib is largely barren of vegetation, lichens and succulents are found in coastal areas, while grasses, shrubs, and ephemeral plants thrive near the escarpment. Several types of trees are also able to survive the extremely arid climate.

Geography and geology 

The Namib Desert is one of the 500 distinct physiographic provinces of the South African Platform physiographic division. To the north, the desert leads into the Kaokoveld; the dividing line between these two regions is roughly at the latitude of the city of Walvis Bay, and it consists in a narrow strip of land (about 50 km wide) that is the driest place in Southern Africa. To the south, the Namib borders the South African Karoo semi-desert.

Southern Namib (between Lüderitz and the Kuiseb River) comprises a vast dune sea with some of the tallest and most spectacular dunes in the world, ranging in color from pink to vivid orange. In the Sossusvlei area, several dunes exceed  in height. The complexity and regularity of dune patterns in its dune sea have attracted the attention of geologists for decades, but it remains poorly understood.

The source of the unconsolidated sand (the most recent sand sea) is dominantly from the Orange River, which drains into the Atlantic south of the Namib Sand Sea, with minor contributions in the east from the (now ephemeral) rivers that drain into the sand sea. For this reason, the Namib Sand Sea has been referred to as the "wind displaced delta of the Orange River."

Moving north from Sossusvlei, the sand gradually gives way to a rocky desert that extends from Sossusvlei to the Swakop river. This area is traversed by the Tropic of Capricorn and is mostly flat, although some scenic canyons and elevations are found in some areas, for example in the Moon Valley system. While most of the soil is rocky, sand dunes are still occasionally found in this region; for example, sand dunes occupy much of the coastline between Walvis Bay and Swakopmund.

The Namib desert is an important location for the mining of tungsten, salt, and diamonds.

Several rivers and streams run through the Namib, although all of the rivers south of the Cunene River and north of the Orange River are ephemeral and rarely or never reach the ocean. These rivers arise in the interior mountains of Namibia and flow after summer rain storms.

Climate 
The Namib's aridity is caused by the descent of dry air of the Hadley Cell, cooled by the cold Benguela current along the coast. Besides rain being scarce, it is also unpredictable. Western Namib gets less rain (5 mm) than eastern Namib (85 mm). This is due to several factors. Winds coming from the Indian Ocean lose part of their humidity when passing the Drakensberg mountains, and are essentially dry when they reach the Namib Escarpment at the eastern end of the desert. On the other hand, winds coming from the Atlantic Ocean are pressed down by hot air from the east; their humidity thus forms clouds and fog. Morning fogs coming from the ocean and pushing inwards into the desert are a regular phenomenon along the coast, and much of the life cycle of animals and plants in the Namib relies on these fogs as the main source of water.

The dry climate of Namib reflects the almost complete lack of bodies of water on the surface. Most rivers flow underground and/or are dry for most of the year. Even when they are not, they usually drain into endorheic basins, without reaching the sea. The Swakop and the Omaruru are the only rivers that occasionally drain into the ocean.

All along the coast, but mostly in the northernmost part of it, the interaction between the water-laden air coming from the sea via southerly winds, some of the strongest of any coastal desert, and the dry air of the desert causes immense fogs and strong currents. It causes sailors to lose their way; this is testified by the remnants of several shipwrecks that can be found along the Skeleton Coast, in northern Namib.
Benguela's El Niño (similar to the Pacific event in its environmental change in the seas) spreads from the Kunene estuary southward to, on occasion, south of Luderitz. Warm waters with depth and associated water flow from the northwest were first fully catalogued by Sea Fisheries researchers, in Cape Town (L V Shannon et al.). The research noted the positive effect of Benguela's El Niño on the rainfall of the interior. Rainfall records also show positive values variously across the Namib, Desert Research Station, and Gobabeb for instance. This event recurs approximately mid-decade (recent examples are 1974, 1986, 1994, 1995, and 2006).

Plants and animals

Flora

Several unusual species of plants and animals are found in this desert, many of which are endemic and highly adapted to the specific climate of the area. One of the most well-known endemic plants of the Namib is the bizarre Welwitschia mirabilis; a shrub-like plant, it grows two long strap-shaped leaves continuously throughout its lifetime. These leaves may be several meters long, gnarled, and twisted from the desert winds. The taproot of the plant develops into a flat, concave disc in age.  Welwitschia is notable for its survival in the extremely arid conditions in Namib, mostly deriving moisture from the coastal sea fogs. An area where Welwitschias are a common sight is found in the surroundings of the Moon Valley, including the eponymous Welwitschia Plains.

Fauna

The Namib fauna mostly comprises arthropods and other small animals that can live on little water, but a few species of bigger animals are also found, including antelopes (such as gemsboks and springboks), ostriches, and in some areas even desert elephants. All these species have developed techniques to survive in the Namib environment. Several endemic darkling beetles species — such as the Namib Desert beetle — have bumpy elytrons with a pattern of hydrophilic bumps and hydrophobic troughs. These cause humidity from the morning fogs to condense into droplets, which roll down the beetle's back to its mouth; they are collectively known as "fog beetles". Another beetle, the Lepidochora discoidalis, builds "water-capturing" webs. Black-backed jackals lick humidity from stones. Gemsboks (also known as the South African oryx) can raise the temperature of their bodies to 40 °C in the hottest hours of the day. The desert is also home to meerkats and several species of lizards.

Human activity 

Before the 20th century, some San roamed the Namib, gathering edible plants on the shore, hunting in the interior, and drinking the juice of the tsamma melon for water. Today, some Herero still herd their livestock in the Kaokoveld in the Namib and take them from waterhole to waterhole. A few Nama Khoikhoi still graze their livestock on the banks of the Kuiseb River in the desert. Most of the native people have left, leaving the vast majority of the desert uninhabited.

The steppes in the southern half of the desert are mostly made up of ranches run by Europeans, who raise Karakul sheep with local help and send the pelts of the lambs to Europe for use in fur coats. Most of the rest of the desert is set aside for conservation. A vast portion of the desert, called the Sperrgebiet, was access-restricted due to the presence of diamonds, which are mined in the area at the mouth of the Orange River. Although the desert is largely unpopulated and inaccessible, there are year-round settlements at Sesriem, close to the Sossusvlei area, and other small outposts in other locations. Moçâmedes in Angola, and Lüderitz, Walvis Bay, and Swakopmund in Namibia, bordering on the desert, are the main settlements in the area.

The 2015 film Mad Max: Fury Road was filmed here.

In 2019 the Namibian-German artist Max Siedentopf created an installation in the Namib consisting of a ring of large white blocks atop of which sit six speakers attached to a solar-powered MP3 player configured to continuously play the 1982 song "Africa" by the American band Toto. The exact location of the installation has not been disclosed.

Namib-Naukluft National Park 

The Namib-Naukluft National Park, which extends over a large part of the Namib Desert, is the largest game reserve in Africa and one of the largest in the world. While most of the park is hardly accessible, several well-known visitor attractions are found in the desert. The prominent attraction is the Sossusvlei area, where high orange sand dunes surround vivid white salt pans, creating a fascinating landscape.

Notable places 
 Bogenfels
 Sesriem
 Skeleton Coast
 Solitaire
 Sossusvlei
 Deadvlei
 Dune 45
 Spitzkoppe
 Swakopmund

See also 
 Animals Are Beautiful People, a nature documentary set in the Namib
 List of deserts by area

References 

 National Geographic, January 1992, pp. 54–85.
 Mary Seely: The Namib: Natural History of an Ancient Desert, 3rd ed., Windhoek: Desert Research Foundation of Namibia 2004, .

Further reading

External links 

 
 Namib Naukluft Park photo gallery
 Namib Desert photo gallery

Deserts of Namibia
Deserts of South Africa
Afrotropical ecoregions
Ergs of Africa
Physiographic provinces
World Heritage Sites in Namibia
Namib-Naukluft National Park
First 100 IUGS Geological Heritage Sites